Riyanto Subagja (born 28 April 1993) is an Indonesian badminton player. He is from PB. Djarum, a badminton club in Kudus, Central Java and has joined the club since 2006 and later representing Pertamina Fastron team. He was the champion of the 2009 Auckland International Series and 2013 Iran Fajr International Challenge tournament.

Achievements

BWF International Challenge/Series 
Men's singles

  BWF International Challenge tournament
  BWF International Series tournament

Performance timeline

National team 
 Junior level

Individual competitions 
 Junior level

 Senior level

References

External links 

1993 births
Living people
Sportspeople from Jakarta
Indonesian male badminton players